Dionysius II may refer to:

 Dionysius II of Syracuse (c. 397 BC – 343 BC), tyrant of Syracuse
 Patriarch Dionysius II of Antioch, Syrian Orthodox Patriarch of Antioch in 896–909 
 Patriarch Dionysius II of Constantinople, Ecumenical Patriarch in 1546–1556
 Mar Dionysius II (1742–1816), Malankara Metropolitan 1815–1816